The Freedom of the Press Act (Swedish: Tryckfrihetsförordningen) is one of four Fundamental Laws of the Realm (Swedish: rikets grundlagar) and thus forms part of the Swedish Constitution. The Act regulates matters regarding freedom of press and principle of public access to official records. The Freedom of the Press Act as well as the Fundamental Law on Freedom of Expression (Swedish: Yttrandefrihetsgrundlagen) is one of the two "basic media acts" in Sweden. The Freedom of the Press Act is derived from the Freedom of the Press Act of 1766; the legislation is regarded as the world's first law supporting the freedom of the press and freedom of information.

History

Freedom of the Press Act of 1766 and the Age of Liberty 
Following the death of King Charles XII in 1718, the Swedish throne was passed to a series of weak kings. During Adolf Frederick's weakened rule in the age of liberty of the Swedish 18th century with its absence of a single governor, greater decision-making space for the parliament, and decline of the monarchy led to an increase in the importance of the Riksdag. Though the Riksdag retained its four chambers—for nobility, clergy, townsmen, and farmers—it developed two strong parties known as the "Hats" and the "Caps."

In 1765 the Swedish government initiated a comprehensive revision of the constitution. The Ostrobothnian priest Anders Chydenius was a driving force and author behind one of the three pleas for freedom of the press submitted to parliament. In his writing, he concludes:No evidence should be needed that a certain freedom of writing and printing is one of the strongest bulwarks of a free organization of the state, as, without it, the estates would not have sufficient information for the drafting of good laws, and those dispensing justice would not be monitored, nor would the subjects know the requirements of the law, the limits of the rights of government, and their responsibilities. Education and ethical conduct would be crushed; coarseness in thought, speech, and manners would prevail, and dimness would darken the entire sky of our freedom in a few years.Under the leadership of the Anders Chydenius, the Caps at the Swedish Riksdag in Gävle on 2 December 1766, passed the adoption of a freedom of the press regulation that stopped censorship and introduced the principle of public access to official records in the Swedish authority. Excluded were defamatory of the king's majesty and the Swedish Church.

King Gustav III revisions 
At the time of King Gustav III accession, the Swedish Riksdag held more power than the monarchy; however, the Swedish Riksdag was divided between the two rival parties: the Hats and Caps. The subsequent attempts of the dominant Caps to reduce him to a roi fainéant (a powerless king) encouraged him to consider a coup d'état. In 1772, King Gustav III seized power through a coup d'état. Two years later, the Act was largely rolled back when he presented an alternative Freedom of the Press Act, leaving it to the king's discretion to determine what gets printed. Penalties were made more severe and violations could, in many cases, lead to execution. The new act also introduced strong limitations on the principle of access to public information.

Freedom of the Press Act of 1949 
In 1949 the law was revised, but its main principles are still the same as in 1766.

References 

Law of Sweden
Constitution of Sweden
Freedom of the press